The Krasniye Kryl'ya Deltacraft MD-50C is a Russian ultralight trike, designed and produced by Krasniye Kryl'ya of Taganrog. The aircraft is supplied as a complete ready-to-fly-aircraft.

Design and development
It features a cable-braced hang glider-style high-wing, weight-shift controls, a two-seats-in-tandem open cockpit with a cockpit fairing, tricycle landing gear with wheel pants and a single engine in pusher configuration.

The aircraft is made from bolted-together aluminum tubing, with its double surface wing covered in Dacron sailcloth. The wing is supported by a single tube-type kingpost and uses an "A" frame weight-shift control bar. The powerplant is a twin cylinder, air-cooled, two-stroke, dual-ignition  Rotax 503 engine or liquid-cooled  Rotax 582.

A number of different wings can be fitted to the basic carriage, including a  wing produced by the company.

Variants
Deltacraft MD-50C
Version with  Rotax 582 engine
Mandelevium MD-30
Version with  Rotax 503 engine

Specifications (Deltacraft MD-50C)

References

External links

Photo of the Krasniye Kryl'ya Deltacraft MD-50C

2000s Russian sport aircraft
2000s Russian ultralight aircraft
Single-engined pusher aircraft
Ultralight trikes